| belowclass=noprint
| below = {{#if: {}| |  The Scouting Portal}}
}}

King's Scout (Malay: Pengakap Raja), also known as King's Scout Award (Malay: Anugerah Pengakap Raja), is the highest award of the Scouts Association of Malaysia (PPM). The King's Scout Certificate is signed by His Majesty the Yang di-Pertuan Agong of Malaysia and all the sultans in Malaysia.

King's Scout Award has the same status and level as Eagle Scout in United States and Philippines, King's Scout in United Kingdom, Australia and New Zealand, Dragon Scout in Hong Kong, President's Scout in Singapore, Pramuka Garuda in Indonesia, Tiger Scout in Korea, Fuji Scout in Japan, Crown Scout in Belgium and Netherlands, King's Scout in Thailand, Queen's Venturer Award in Canada and many more.

In order to qualify for this award, a scout candidate must obtain certain badges and must go through certain processes.

Terminology 
The correct name for this award in Malaysia is King's Scout (Malay: Pengakap Raja) and not Royal's Scout (Malay: Pengakap Diraja or Pengakap DiRaja).

Eligibility process

Early process 

First of all, a candidate must pass all the badges from the Membership Badge, Pengakap Muda Development Badge (Usaha, Maju and Jaya Badge as well as 2 Favorite Badges, 3 Knowledge Badges and 3 Service Badges) at the Junior Scout level (Form 1, 2 and 3) to Lencana-Lencana Tertinggi (Jayadiri, Kemahiran, Kegiatan, Ekspedisi and Perkhidmatan Badges) at the Senior Scout level (Form 4 and 5).

Candidates must record all forms of knowledge, skills or evidence into their respective log books.

King's Scout Pre-Rating Test Camp 

Next, the qualified candidate will submit his application form to the district commissioner along with his log book and certificate (all badges that been received). They will be assessed during the King's Scout Pre-Rating Test Camp (Pre-King's Scout Assessment Camp) and will last for 4 days 3 nights that will be organized by the respective District King's Scout Evaluation Council, which have all of these components:
 Responsibility,
 Expedition,
 Community Service,
 Activities and;
 Independent.

All documentation and log books made by the candidates are fully inspected for evaluation by the District King's Scout Evaluation Council.

After the candidate completes and passes the King's Scout Pre-Rating Test Camp, he is recognized and given permission to wear the Senior Cord or known as the National Chief Scout's Award, which is royal yellow in colour. As such, the candidate has all the conditions ready for the next process.

King's Scout Rating Test Camp 

After that, the candidate then needs to attend the King's Scout Rating Test Camp (King's Scout Assessment Camp), 5 days 4 nights which will be organized by the respective State King's Scout Evaluation Council. Such assessments are according to the national scheme and involve:
 Camping, 
 Pilot project models, 
 First aid, 
 Estimation, 
 Knots and ties, 
 Map assessment, 
 Foot and stick marching, 
 Jungle cooking, 
 Modern cuisine, 
 Traditional songs and dances, 
 Personal and grouping interviews, 
 Bushman's Thong making, 
 Handicraft making and more.

All documentation and log books made by the candidates are fully inspected for evaluation by the State King's Scout Evaluation Council.

After passing all the required tests, candidates are given the permission to wear the Bushman's Thong, which is self-made by themselves at the King's Scout Rating Test Camp and will be worn on their King's Scout Ceritificate Award Ceremonies. Once they undertake all their tests, they will be informed by the State King's Scout Evaluation Council through their school's principle either they'd pass or not. If they pass all the tests, the official invitation letter will be sent to their home about their King's Scout Ceritificate Award Ceremonies.

Retrieval and percentage failed 
If the candidate fails in any of the tests, the candidate is allowed to attend again until the candidate passes (at the candidate's own choice) as long as he does not violate any of the conditions set by the King Scout Evaluation Council. The percentage for candidates to pass all the tests is very small because most candidates have failed or have not mastered the knowledge and skills of scouting.

Eligibility requirements 
A Senior Scout before being awarded the King's Scout Badge and Certificate shall:

 Has been a scout member for at least 3 consecutive years before applying to undergo the King's Scout Pre-Rating Test Camp.
 Already pass all the badges from the Membership Badge, Pengakap Muda Development Badge (Usaha, Maju and Jaya Badge, as well as 2 Favorite Badges, 3 Knowledge Badges and 3 Service Badges) to Lencana-Lencana Tertinggi (Jayadiri, Kemahiran, Kegiatan, Ekspedisi and Perkhidmatan Badges) and has held a Senior Cord (National Scout Leader Award) as well as passed the King's Scout Pre-Rating Test Camp by the District King's Scout Evaluation Council (at the district scout level) and the King's Scout Rating Test Camp by the State King's Scout Evaluation Council (at the state scout level).
 Has held a Senior Cord (National Scout Leader Award) and is not less than seventeen years old when applying to undergo the King's Scout Rating Test Camp.
 Has completed and passed the log book evaluation by the District King's Scout Evaluation Council and the State King's Scout Evaluation Council. All records and evidence must also be recorded in the candidate log book.
 Recognized to have adequate scouting skills and willing to practice those skills for the community.
 Recognized by the Chief Commissioner of the National Scout as a well-behaved and have the personality of a scout who can be an example.
Other conditions that need to be met differ according to the eligibility requirements of the respective districts and states.

Award ceremonies, badges and certificates

King's Scout Ceritificate Award Ceremonies 
They will also be invited to the Royal Palace of their respective states (for example at Istana Anak Bukit, Alor Setar, Kedah for the state of Kedah or Istana Maziah, Kuala Terengganu, Terengganu for the state of Terengganu) or specially booked halls (for example Dewan Jubli Perak, Bangunan Sultan Salahuddin Abdul Aziz Shah, Shah Alam, Selangor for the state of Selangor or Dewan Bankuet, Bangunan Perak Darul Ridzuan, Ipoh, Perak for the state of Perak) to be awarded the prestigious King's Scout Certificate by the Sultan or Yang di-Pertua Negeri in the state, in the name of the Yang di-Pertuan Agong, patron of the PPM.

King's Scout Badge 
Once a candidate is eligible to receive the King's Scout Award, the candidate will obtain the King's Scout Badge in yellow, blue and green and will be worn on the candidate's left arm. This badge can only be issued by the Scouts Association of Malaysia (PPM) and cannot be made arbitrarily or misused by others.

King's Scout Certificate 

The Royal King's Scout Certificate or also known as the King's Scout Certificate is issued by PPM HQ is given by the state Sultan or Governor in the name of the Yang di-Pertuan Agong Malaysia, the Patron of the Scouts Association of Malaysia. This certificate is unique because it has 10 signatures, preceded by incumbent Yang di-Pertuan Agong Malaysia and the 9 Sultans of the royal states. So far, no other certificate can match or beat the King's Scout Certificate.

After achieving the rank of King's Scout 
The King's Scouts are expected to set an example for other Scouts and to become the leaders in life that they have demonstrated themselves to be in Scouting. Therefore, they can join and become a member of the Malaysian King's Scout Brotherhood and the Association of Top Achiever Scouts (ATAS).

Malaysian King's Scout Brotherhood 
After passing and being recognized as a King's Scout, a candidate can register to become a member of the Malaysian King's Scout Brotherhood (Malay: Persaudaraan Pengakap Raja Malaysia).

Association of Top Achiever Scouts 
The candidates who are awarded the King's Scout Badge are eligible to apply to become the member of the Association of Top Achiever Scouts (ATAS) (Malay: Persatuan Pengakap Berprestasi Tinggi) and get their badge. This badge is worn on the left arm of the candidate and under the King's Scout Badge.

In Scouts Association of Malaysia, to qualify for the ATAS badge, a candidate must receive one of these awards, either:
 King's Scout Award (for the Senior Scout stage) or;
 Baden-Powell Award (for the Rover Scout stage).

Recipients 

Notable King's Scout Award recipients include:

 Datuk Seri Shamsul Iskandar @ Yusre bin Haji Mohd Akin – Former Malaysian Deputy Minister of Primary Industries (2018–2020) and Member of the House of Representatives for Bukit Katil (2013–2018) & Hang Tuah Jaya (2018–2022).
 Eric Khoo Heng-Pheng – Former Member of the World Scout Committee, former Chairman of the Asia Pacific Regional Scout Committee and former Assistant National Chief Commissioner of the Scouts Association of Malaysia.
 Dato' Haji Pkharuddin bin Haji Ghazali –  Malaysian Director-General of Education (since 2022).
 Major General (Rtd.) Professor Dato' Dr. Mohd Zin bin Bidin – Current Malaysian National Chief Scout Commissioner (since 2016), founding Dean of the Faculty of Medicine, National Defense University of Malaysia and former Vice-Chancellor of Widad University College (formerly known as University College Shahputra).
 Major (Rtd.) Haji Mior Rosli bin Dato’ Haji Mior Mohd Jaafar – Retired RMAF Major, former Chief Commissioner of Kuala Lumpur Scouts and recipient of Bintang Semangat Rimba Kelas Dua – Perak (BSR – II) by PPM.

See also 

List of highest awards in Scouting

Notes

References 

Scout and Guide awards
Scouting